Willie W. McIntosh was the Skip on the Findo Gask CC curling team (from Perth, Scotland) during the World Curling Championships known as the 1961 Scotch Cup. The team won The Rink Championship in 1961.

References

External links

Scottish male curlers
Possibly living people
Year of birth missing